Audley End is a hamlet in the civil parish of Lawshall in the Babergh district in the county of Suffolk, England. Ashen Wood is nearby where the parish gallows were located.

References

External links

Lawshall Archives Group
Geograph: Pictures of Lawshall & environs
 Map showing Audley End on streetmap.co.uk
A Vision of Britain Through Time – Boundary Map of Lawshall

Hamlets in Suffolk
Lawshall